Lake Elmo is a lake in Washington County, Minnesota, in the United States. It is partially within Lake Elmo park reserve. The park also contains walking paths, camp grounds, playgrounds, and a swimming pond.

The lake was named after the 1866 novel St. Elmo by Augusta Jane Evans.

See also
 Lake Elmo, Minnesota
 List of lakes in Minnesota

References

Lakes of Minnesota
Lakes of Washington County, Minnesota